Michele Pagano (1697–1732) was an Italian painter of the late Baroque period, active in his natal city of Naples.

Pagano initially trained under Raimondo di Dominici, known as il Maltese. Working later with Bernardo de Dominici, he became a follower of Franz Joachim Beich, and flourished as a landscape painter or vedutista, but died in his mid-thirties. He left di Dominici to work with Gaetano Martoriello. He is said to have died from Mercury treatment of venereal disease. It is unknown if he is a distant relation to Francesco Pagano, a painter of the 15th century in Naples.

Notes

References

1697 births
1732 deaths
17th-century Neapolitan people
17th-century Italian painters
Italian male painters
18th-century Italian painters
Painters from Naples
Italian Baroque painters
Italian vedutisti
18th-century Neapolitan people
18th-century Italian male artists